Humen railway station is a station in Baisha Village, Humen, Dongguan City, Guangdong Province, China. It is one of the stations on the Guangzhou–Shenzhen–Hong Kong Express Rail Link between Guangzhou South railway station in the Panyu District and Futian railway station in Shenzhen City.

The tunnel was completed in March 2011.

See also
 Guangzhou–Shenzhen–Hong Kong Express Rail Link

References

Buildings and structures in Dongguan
Railway stations in Guangdong
Railway stations in China opened in 2011